Raymond F. Schinazi is an American organic medicinal chemist with expertise in antiviral agents, pharmacology, and biotechnology. His research focuses on developing treatments for infections caused by human immunodeficiency virus (HIV), hepatitis B (HBV), hepatitis C (HCV), herpes, dengue fever, zika, chikungunya, and other emerging viruses. These treatment options include antiviral agents as well as synthetic, biochemical, pharmacological and molecular genetic approaches, including molecular modeling and gene therapy.

Early life and education 
Schinazi was born on March 21, 1950 in Alexandria, Egypt to Jewish parents. In 1962, his family was sequestered by the Nasser regime and in 1964 they immigrated to Naples, Italy as refugees. Schinazi went to Boarding School in the UK where he completed his early education prior to being admitted as a Chemistry major at the University of Bath in 1968. He received his BSc (1972) and PhD (1976) in Chemistry and DSc (Hon) (2006) in Biotechnology from the University of Bath, England. In 1976, he moved to Yale University, department of Pharmacology and trained as a postdoctoral fellow with William H. Prusoff.

He also completed-post doctoral trainings in Virology at the University of Chicago with Dr. Bernard Roizman and at University of North Carolina with Dr. Yung-Chi Cheng, and Virology/Immunology at Emory University with Dr. André Nahmias.

Career 
Schinazi is currently the Frances Winship Walters Professor of Pediatrics, Director of the Laboratory of Biochemical Pharmacology, and co-Director of the HIV Cure Scientific Working Group within the NIH-sponsored Emory University Center for AIDS Research (CFAR) in Atlanta, Georgia, USA. He has served at Emory University for 39 years since 1978. He also holds Adjunct Professor positions at both University of Georgia (Atlanta, GA) and University of Miami (Miami, Florida). He worked part-time for the Emory University affiliated Atlanta VA for 35 years while maintaining his Emory University appointment, retiring from the VA in 2016.

He began his work as a herpes virologist with a specific focus on developing drug therapeutics for orolabial and genital herpes and severe life-threatening infections like herpes encephalitis. When HIV was identified as a virus in the 1980s, Schinazi and his fellow researchers directed their attention towards the problem. He was able to translate his knowledge gained through his work on the herpes viruses towards addressing HIV and HBV. He is credited for setting up the first-ever HIV laboratory at Emory University complete with a protocol on how to handle the dangerous virus in the laboratory setting so he and his team could pursue the development of novel antiviral drugs. In 1987, he helped Prusoff's laboratory discover that d4T, a nucleoside analog, had selective activity against HIV.

Schinazi is best known for his involvement in the discovery and/or development of innovative anti-HIV, HBV, and HCV drugs on the market. To date, he has been involved in the development of five FDA-approved drugs of which three are used in eight different drug combinations. More than 94% of HIV-infected individuals take at least one of the drugs he invented. He has authored more than 550 peer-reviewed papers in academic literature with over 20,000 total citations.

Discovery and development of lamivudine (3TC)
Among the first drugs discovered and developed for treatment of HIV came through the collaboration between Dr. Dennis Liotta (Emory) and Schinazi. In 1992, they first published on lamivudine (3TC) in Antimicrobial Agents and Chemotherapy. This drug became one of the most successful antiviral agents used to combat HIV as part of fixed-dose combinations (including Combivir, Trizivir, Epzicom, and Triumeq). Combination therapies incorporating 3TC quickly became the standard of care, with safe and effective nucleoside reverse transcriptase (RF) inhibitors, such as 3TC and its related cousins, serving as the cornerstones of combination chemotherapy. 3TC was also found to be active against HBV in collaboration with Drs. Dennis Liotta, Philip Furman and Yung-Chi Cheng.

Discovery and development of emtricitabine [(-)-FTC or FTC] 
Schinazi's work led to the discovery of a second nucleoside analog, emtricitabine (FTC), subsequently resulting in a potent, safe nucleoside analog commonly used in treatment regimens. The discovery of FTC was first published in 1992 in Antimicrobial Agents and Chemotherapy as another new anti-HIV compound. The mechanism of action of FTC is by incorporation of FTC-TP into the growing viral DNA strand results in chain termination, disrupting viral DNA synthesis. Disruption of this process results in rapid reduction of systemic viral loads to undetectable in HIV-infected individuals, effectively allowing for significant rebound of CD4+ T-cells, effectively providing a tandem mechanism resulting in control of systemic viremia and restoration of functional immunity. In addition, FTC in combination with tenofovir disoproxil fumarate (Truvada) was approved as a prophylactic drug (part of PrEP) to prevent transmission of HIV, further broadening its utility beyond HIV-infected individuals to that of prophylaxis, underscoring a novel and previously unmet need with ramifications for global health worldwide. Today, this drug is widely used as part of fixed-dose combination drug regimens, including Truvada, Atripla, Complera, Stribild, Descovy, Genvoya, Stribild, Odefsey, and Eviplera. Like 3TC, FTC was found to be active against HBV, but was never approved for this indication by the US FDA.

Sofosbuvir (Sovaldi) 
In 2004, Schinazi was one of the founders of Pharmasset, a company that would later go on to develop sofosbuvir. The name Pharmasset was derived from 'pharmaceutical assets' and the original business plan was to create assets that would be sold to other companies. The company raised around $45M in its 2007 IPO at $9 per share.  It would later be taken over at $137 per share. In November 2011, Gilead Sciences announced a takeover bid for Pharmasset for approximately $11.4 billion.

Schinazi's contribution to the discovery of sofosbuvir is contentious.  He is the co-author of a 2005 paper that discovered a precursor to the drug. Jean-Pierre Sommadossi, a principal founder of Idenix and a co-founder of Pharmasset, is a former business partner who no longer speaks to Schinazi.

In litigation between Idenix and Gilead/Pharmasset, there was an Order denying Idenix's motion for enhanced damages where the court noted that Schinazi "violated his confidentialy obligations to Idenix, and shared with Pharmasset scientists Idenix's proprietary discoveries relating to treatment of HCV". However, even “fully accepting Idenix’s view of the evidence,” it was the company Schinazi founded, Pharmasset, not Idenix, that synthesized the key “compound that led to a cure for HCV.”. Even accepting that Idenix discovered a component of the compound, the cure for HCV was discovered only after Pharmasset/Gilead's ”revolutionary refinement of that invention.” Patent law, according to the order, reflects a balance between protection “and the importance of facilitating the imitation and refinement through imitation that are necessary to invention itself and the very lifeblood of a competitive economy.”

In 2014, Dr. Schinazi working  together with the Egyptian government and Gilead Sciences, agreed to provide Egypt with the drug Sofosbuvir (Sovaldi) for about US$1,000, which is only one percent of its market price. Also working with Pharco, an Egyptian Pharmaceutical company Sovaldi is now available for less than US$120 per cure. In Egypt, there is currently a total of around 12 million Egyptians infected with hepatitis C.

Other drugs 
Schinazi has also had a hand in the development of the other FDA-approved drugs Stavudine, Lamivudine, and Telbivudine.

Honors and awards 
In 2018, Schinazi received the Chevalier de la Légion d’honneur, the French Legion of Honor, with the rank of knight. Established in 1802 by Napoleon Bonaparte, it is the highest decoration bestowed in France and recognizes outstanding service to the French Republic. He is the recipient of numerous other awards, including: the Bruce Witte (Blumberg) Annual Distinguished Award- Hepatitis B Foundation (2000);</ref> Distinguished Scientist Award- Hepatitis B Foundation (2006); Emory University's Dean's Distinguished Faculty Lecture and Award (2008); Inductee- Technology Hall of Fame of Georgia (2011); Intellectual Property Legends Award- Georgia State University (2012); Charter Fellow- National Academy of Inventors (2013); Distinguished Medical Science Award- Friends of the National Library of Medicine (2013);</ref> Distinguished Scientific Achievement Award- American Liver Foundation (2014); Research & Hope Award for Excellence in Academic Research- PhRMA Foundation (2014); William S. Middleton Award- US Veterans Affairs (2015); Tom Glaser Leadership Award- Connexx Eagle Star Awards (2015); Lifetime Achievement Award- Scrip Award, London (2016); Lifetime Achievement Award for Public Service- Institute of Human Virology (2016). He also received the Intellectual Property Legends Award and is a charter fellow of the National Academy of Inventors, was inducted into the Technology Hall of Fame of Georgia, and the Georgia Biomedical Industry Growth Award.

Founder 
Schinazi has been a founder of: 
 Triangle Pharmaceuticals, which was taken over by Gilead Sciences
 Pharmasset, also taken over by Gilead
 Idenix Pharmaceuticals, taken over by Merck for $3.85 billion
 RFS Pharma, which merged with Cocrystal Pharma.  RFS are the initials of Schinazi's name.

References

Works cited
 

1950 births
Egyptian Jews
People from Alexandria
Gilead Sciences people
Emory University faculty
Living people
21st-century American chemists
HIV/AIDS researchers
Hepatitis C